In Tune is a British music magazine programme on BBC Radio 3. It is broadcast in the weekday evening "drive time" slot and features a mix of live and recorded classical and jazz music, interviews with musicians, and arts news. It is billed as "Radio 3's flagship early evening music programme". 

It is broadcast live from the BBC's Broadcasting House in London, and has been noted for its relaxed, convivial style of presentation.

Format
Each programme is followed by the In Tune Mixtape, a 30-minute playlist of music compiled in the style of a mixtape with no presenter commentary. The playlist usually features an eclectic mix of classical works and other musical genres.

History

The programme was first broadcast on 13 July 1992, hosted by Natalie Wheen. It was launched in response to the forthcoming launch of the competitor radio station Classic FM. Early shows were additionally presented by Humphrey Carpenter. Since 1997, the show has been hosted by Sean Rafferty, a presenter known for his work on BBC Northern Ireland.

In 2017, Katie Derham joined the programme as a presenter. Derham was an established broadcaster on BBC arts programming, and was especially known as a presenter on BBC Proms. Broadcaster Suzy Klein has also presented the show.

References

External links

 

1992 radio programme debuts
BBC Radio 3 programmes
British music radio programmes
British talk radio programmes